Khaldoun Ismail Moussa (born 8 June 1999), is a Qatari footballer who plays as a midfielder for Qatar Stars League side Al-Kharaitiyat .

Career statistics

Club

Notes

References

1999 births
Living people
Qatari footballers
Association football midfielders
Al-Arabi SC (Qatar) players
Al Kharaitiyat SC players
Qatar Stars League players